Zhiyuan Temple is a Buddhist temple located on Mount Jiuhua, in Qingyang County, Anhui, China. Alongside Ganlu Temple, Baisui Palace and Dongyan Chan Temple are honoured as the "Four Buddhist Temple on Mount Jiuhua".

Name
The name of the temple is cited from Buddhist Stories, which says that Gautama Buddha resided in a monastery named "Zhiyuan" or "Guduyuan" or Jetavana for over twenty years.

History
Zhiyuan Temple was first built in the Jiajing period (1522–1566) of the Ming dynasty (1368–1644), and went through many changes and repairs through the following Qing dynasty (1644–1911). Most of the present structures in the temple were repaired or built in the Qing dynasty. In 1841, during the reign of Daoguang Emperor (1840–1850) in the Qing dynasty, abbot Longshan died. His body became a mummy but was destroyed by the Red Guards in the Cultural Revolution.

The temple was originally named "Zhishu'an" and renamed "Zhiyuan Temple" after the extension under the leadership of monk Dagen.

Zhiyuan Temple has been designated as a National Key Buddhist Temple in Han Chinese Area by the State Council of China in 1983. On October 28, 2014, it was classified as a municipal cultural unit by the local government.

Architecture

The existing main buildings include the Shanmen, Four Heavenly Kings Hall, Mahavira Hall, Lingguan Hall, Maitreya Hall, Reception Hall, Dining Hall, and Abbot's Room.

Shanmen
The Shanmen is flush threefold story gable roof style. Statues of Heng and Ha and Lord Lingguan are enshrined in the hall.

Four Heavenly Kings Hall
The Four Heavenly Kings Hall has a double-eave gable and hip roof. Statues of Four Heavenly Kings are housed in the hall.

Mahavira Hall
The Mahavira Hall is the main and third hall in the temple. It has a double-eave gable and hip roof covered with yellow glazed tiles, which symbolize a high level in architecture because yellow was the symbol of the royal family.

The hall houses three gilded copper statues of Three-Life Buddha, namely Sakyamuni, Amitabha and Bhaisajyaguru. The statue of Guanyin is placed at the back of the three statues. The statues of Eighteen Arhats stand on both sides of the hall.

Cultural relics

The Buddhist Texts Library has the only Tripitaka collection in Chinese printed by the Qing imperial court and 1,669 other Tripitaka books.

References

Bibliography
 
 

Buddhist temples on Mount Jiuhua
Buildings and structures in Chizhou
Tourist attractions in Chizhou
19th-century establishments in China
19th-century Buddhist temples